Kosaraju Raghavayya (23 June 1905 – 27 October 1987), known mononumously by his surname Kosaraju, was an Indian lyricist and poet known for his works in Telugu cinema. He wrote about 3,000 songs in 350 films. His lyrics are steeped in Telugu folklore and rural idiom. He was awarded the prestigious Raghupathi Venkaiah Award by the Government of Andhra Pradesh for his contribution to Telugu cinema in 1984.

He wrote memorable songs like "Eruvaka Sagaro", "Niluvave Vaalu Kanuladhana", "Illarikamlo Unna Maza", "Chethilo Dabbulu Poyene", "Anukunnadokkati Ainadi Okkati", "Ye Nimishana Yemi Jaruguno", "Jayammu Nischayammu ra", "Maa Voollo Oka Paduchundi".

Early life
Born in an agricultural family in Appikatla village, Guntur district, Andhra Pradesh, Kosaraju studied Telugu literature, epics and puranas. Kosaraju was influenced by a Telugu scholar Kondamudi Narasimham Pantulu in whose play based on the Ramayana he acted when still in his teens. 

Initially, he worked as a journalist in the Raithu Patrika where he met the famous writer Samudrala Sr. and the director Gudavalli Ramabrahmam. He published his first poetry anthology, Kadagandlu. He died in 1987.

Film career
Kosaraju acted in the Telugu film Raithu Bidda (1939). Later, he shifted his focus to writing lyrics for films. He penned humorous lyrics for K. V. Reddy's Pedda Manushulu (1954), followed by one of his most famous songs, "Jebulo Bomma Je Jela Bomma" (in B. A. Subba Rao's Raju Peda, 1954). He was well known for his earthy poetry, often referring to popular tales of morality and ethics. Kosaraju wrote about 3,000 lyrics for 350 Telugu films.

He wrote memorable songs like "Eruvaka Sagaro", "Illarikamlo Unna Maza" and "Chethilo Dabbulu Poyene".

Filmography

Awards and honours
He was awarded the prestigious Raghupathi Venkaiah Award by the State Government of Andhra Pradesh for his outstanding contribution to Telugu cinema in 1984.
He was given the titles Janapada Kavi Sarvabhouma and Kaviratna.

See also
 Raghupathi Venkaiah Award

References

External links
 Listen to some of the songs of Kosaraju at Old Telugu Songs
 Listen to some of the songs of Kosaraju at Chimata Music.com

1905 births
1987 deaths
20th-century Indian composers
People from Guntur district
Film musicians from Andhra Pradesh
Indian male poets
Telugu-language lyricists
Poets from Andhra Pradesh
Indian male composers
Indian lyricists
20th-century Indian poets
20th-century Indian male writers
20th-century male musicians